Major Levison James Wood  VR (born 5 May 1982) is a British Army officer and explorer. He is best known for his extended walking expeditions in Africa, Asia and Central America. He has also undertaken numerous other overland journeys, including a foot crossing of Madagascar and mountain climbing in Iraq. He documents his journeys through books, documentaries and photography.

Life
The son of teachers Janice Wood (née Curzon) and Levison Wood Sr., Wood was born on 5 May 1982 at the North Staffordshire Royal Infirmary in Hartshill, Staffordshire, and grew up in nearby Forsbrook. Levison was educated at Painsley Catholic College, before obtaining an honours degree in history at the University of Nottingham. He was commissioned as an officer into the Parachute Regiment on 13 April 2006 where he spent four years, serving in Afghanistan in Helmand, Kandahar and Zabul. Wood was promoted to Captain on 13 October 2008.

He left the army in April 2010, took up a career in writing and photography, and has become a bestselling author. He has extensive experience in travel and exploration in over 100 countries and in 2011 was made a Fellow of the Royal Geographical Society. He is an elected Fellow of the Explorers Club in New York, an Honorary Fellow of CASS Business School and holds an honorary doctorate at Staffordshire University.

Wood acts as patron and ambassador for a number of charities including the Tusk Trust, The Glacier Trust and the ABF The Soldiers' Charity. He rejoined the army in 2012, serving as a reservist Major in the 77th Brigade.

Overland expeditions
The expedition to walk the length of the Nile was inspired by explorers John Hanning Speke, Richard Francis Burton, David Livingstone and Henry Morton Stanley. Wood was accompanied by numerous guides, journalists (including Matthew Power) and friends along the different stages of the route. The expedition was commissioned into a television programme for Channel 4 that aired in January 2015, and Wood detailed the trip in his book Walking the Nile. Power died during the programme from severe heat stroke. Wood was forced to abandon a  section in South Sudan due to heavy fighting caused by civil war.

Beginning in December 2013, over the course of nine months he undertook the first ever expedition to walk the entire length of the river Nile from the Nyungwe Forest in Rwanda. The expedition was commissioned as a four-part documentary series for Channel 4 in the UK. He also wrote a Sunday Times bestselling book detailing the expedition, Walking the Nile.

In 2015, Wood embarked on another challenge: to walk the length of the Himalayas from Afghanistan to Bhutan, filming a documentary series and writing another book about the experience, which was published in January 2016.

In September 2017 he began his most ambitious challenge to date: a full circumnavigation of the Arabian Peninsula: travelling from Syria, through Iraq, the Gulf, crossing part of the Empty Quarter desert in Oman, traversing Yemen, Saudi Arabia, Jordan and the Holy Land to finish in Lebanon; an expedition totalling . During the course of the journey he was embedded with Iraqi troops fighting ISIS where he witnessed the liberation of Sharqat and also encountered Palestinian guerrillas and Hezbollah operatives. He visited the city of Palmyra which was then under Russian control. This journey was documented in the Discovery series Arabia With Levison Wood.

Channel 4 broadcast Walking the Americas from January 2017, featuring an expedition from Mexico to Colombia. The channel then broadcast his journey along the Caucasus in the four-episode series From Russia to Iran: Crossing Wild Frontiers.

In May 2020, Channel 4 commenced broadcasting Walking with Elephants, where Levison followed the 650-mile migration of elephants across Botswana.

Awards

Military Awards & Decorations

Literary Awards

Walking the Himalayas was voted "Adventure Travel Book of the Year" for 2016 at the Edward Stanford Travel Writing Awards.

Wood was awarded an Honorary Doctorate by Staffordshire University in 2017 in recognition of his work as an explorer, writer and photographer.

Bibliography
 2015 – Walking the Nile
 2016 – Walking the Himalayas: An Adventure of Survival and Endurance 
 2017 – Eastern Horizons: Hitchhiking the Silk Road
 2017 – Walking the Americas
 2018 – Arabia: A Journey Through The Heart of the Middle East
 2019 – Incredible Journeys: Discovery, Adventure, Danger, Endurance 
 2020 - The Last Giants
 2020 - Encounters: A Photographic Journey
 2021 - The Art of Exploration
 2022 - Endurance

References

External links
 
 

1982 births
Living people
People from Hartshill
British Parachute Regiment officers
Fellows of the Royal Geographical Society
English explorers